Otávio Fantoni, best known as Nininho or Fantoni II (4 April 1907 – 8 February 1935) was a Brazilian-born Italian professional football player, who played as a midfielder.

He was born in Belo Horizonte, into a family of Italian origin, which supported Cruzeiro, than known as Palestra Itália. In Cruzeiro, he played along with his cousins João Fantoni (Ninão) and Leonízio Fantoni (Niginho). In 1931, they were sold to Lazio, where they would be known by their surnames, like a dynasty: Nigão was Fantoni I, he was Fantoni II and Niginho, Fantoni III.

Fantoni made an appearance for the Italy national team on one occasion: in Vittorio Pozzo's selection in the 1934 FIFA World Cup qualification match, on 25 March 1934 against Greece, a 4–0 home victory.

Less than one year later, he injured his nose in a game against Torino. The injury caused a generalized infection that would kill him. He died in Rome, on 8 February 1935.

References

External links
Profile in Laziowiki

1907 births
1935 deaths
Brazilian people of Italian descent
Brazilian footballers
Italian footballers
Association football midfielders
Cruzeiro Esporte Clube players
Serie A players
S.S. Lazio players
Italy international footballers
Footballers from Belo Horizonte